Cuneus is a genus of foraminifera in the Rotaliida found in Upper Cretaceous (Coniacian) to Paleocene marine sediments throughout the boreal regions.

The test is pyramidal in form, triserial throughout, with a triangular section, and may be slightly twisted. The test wall is calcareous, transparent. and finely perforate, the  surface smooth. Sides are flat to slightly concave; sutures flush and oblique. The aperture is a narrow vertical loop on the apertural face of the final chamber.

References 

 Alfred R. Loeblich Jr and Helen Tappan,1988. Forminiferal Genera and their Classification. Van Nostrand Reinhold.

Turrilinidae
Rotaliida genera
Late Cretaceous genus first appearances
Paleocene genus extinctions